Uthman ibn Affan, also spelled by Colloquial Arabic, Turkish and Persian rendering Osman, was a second cousin, son-in-law and notable companion of the Islamic prophet Muhammad, as well as the third of the Rāshidun, or "Rightly Guided Caliphs". Born into a prominent Meccan clan, Banu Umayya of the Quraysh tribe, he played a major role in early Islamic history, and is known for having ordered the compilation of the standard version of the Quran. When Caliph Umar ibn al-Khattab died in office aged 60/61 years, Uthman, aged 68–71 years, succeeded him and was the oldest to rule as Caliph.

Under Uthman's leadership, the Islamic empire expanded into Fars (present-day Iran) in 650, and some areas of Khorāsān (present-day Afghanistan) in 651. The conquest of Armenia had begun by the 640s. His reign also saw widespread protests and unrest that eventually led to armed revolt and his assassination.

Uthman was married to Ruqayya, and upon her death, married Umm Kulthum. Both his wives having been elder daughters of Muhammad and Khadija earned him the honorific title Dhū al-Nurayn ("The Possessor of Two Lights"). Thus, he was also brother-in-law of the fourth Rāshidun Caliph Ali whose own wife, Fātimah, was Muhammad's youngest daughter.

Family and early life

Uthman was born to Affān ibn Abi al-'As, of the Umayya, and to Arwa bint Kurayz, of the Abdshams, both wealthy clans of the Quraysh tribe in Mecca. Arwa's mother was Umm Hakim bint Abd al-Muttalib, making Arwa the first cousin of Muhammad and Uthman his first cousin's son. Uthman had one sister, Amina.

Uthman was born in Ta'if. The exact date is disputed: both 576 and 583 are indicated. He is listed as one of the 22 Meccans "at the dawn of Islam" who knew how to write.

His father, Affan, died at a young age while travelling abroad, leaving Uthman with a large inheritance. He became a merchant like his father, and his business flourished, making him one of the richest men among the Quraysh.

Muhammad's time

Conversion to Islam 
On returning from a business trip to Syria in 611, Uthman learned of Muhammad's declared mission. After a discussion with Abu Bakr, Uthman decided to convert to Islam, and Abu Bakr brought him to Muhammad to declare his faith. Uthman thus became one of the earliest converts to Islam, following Ali, Zayd, Abu Bakr and a few others. His conversion to Islam angered his clan, the Banu Umayyah, who strongly opposed Muhammad's teachings.

Migration to Abyssinia 
Uthman and his wife, Ruqayya, migrated to Abyssinia (modern Ethiopia) in April 615, along with ten Muslim men and three women. Scores of Muslims joined them later. As Uthman already had some business contacts in Abyssinia, he continued to practice his profession as a trader and he continued to flourish.

After four years, the news spread among the Muslims in Abyssinia that the Quraysh of Mecca had accepted Islam, and this acceptance persuaded Uthman, Ruqayya and 39 Muslims to return. However, when they reached Mecca, they found that the news about the Quraysh's acceptance of Islam was false. Nevertheless, Uthman and Ruqayya re-settled in Mecca. Uthman had to start his business afresh, but the contacts that he had already established in Abyssinia worked in his favour and his business prospered once again.

Migration to Medina 
In 622, Uthman and his wife, Ruqayya, were among the third group of Muslims to migrate to Medina. Upon arrival, Uthman stayed with Abu Talha ibn Thabit before moving into the house he purchased a short time later. Uthman was one of the richest merchants of Mecca, with no need of financial help from his Ansari brothers, as he had brought the considerable fortune he had amassed with him to Medina. Most Muslims of Medina were farmers with little interest in trade, and Jews had conducted most trading in the town. Uthman realized there was a considerable commercial opportunity to promote trade among Muslims and soon established himself as a trader in Medina. With hard work and honesty, his business flourished, making him one of the richest men in Medina.

Life in Medina 
When Ali married Fatimah, Uthman bought Ali's shield for five hundred dirhams. Four hundred was set aside as mahr (dower) for Fatimah's marriage, leaving a hundred for all other expenses. Later, Uthman presented the armour back to Ali as a wedding present.

Battles 

According to R. V. C. Bodley, during Muhammad's lifetime, Uthman was not an outstanding figure, was not assigned to any authority, and earned no distinction in any of Muhammad's campaigns. During the Battle of Badr, Muhammad ordered him not to participate in the battle. Muhammad would gest at Uthman's lack of military prowess and whenever he had an excuse to take Uthman out of a battle he would send him off to another task. Uthman had a reputation of favouring family members. One way he displayed this was his habit of splitting war booty among his relatives to the exclusion of the combatants. During the Invasion of Hamra al-Asad a Meccan spy, Muawiyah bin Al Mugheerah, the cousin of Uthman ibn Affan, had been captured. According to the Muslim scholar Safiur Rahman Mubarakpuri, Uthman gave him shelter after getting permission from Muhammad, and Muhammad told him that if he was caught again after 3 days he would be executed. As such, Muawiyah was given a grace period of three days and arranged a camel and provisions for his return journey to Mecca. Uthman departed with Muhammad for Hamra-al-Asad, and Muawiyah overstayed his grace. Though he fled by the time the army returned, Muhammad ordered his pursuit and execution. The orders were carried out.

Muhammad's last years 

In 632, the year Muhammad died, Uthman participated in the Farewell Pilgrimage. Uthman was also present at the event of Ghadir Khumm, where, according to Shia sources, he was among those who pledged allegiance to Ali.

Caliph Abu Bakr's era (632–634) 
Uthman had a very close relationship with Abu Bakr, as it was due to him that Uthman had converted to Islam. When Abu Bakr was selected as the caliph, Uthman was the first person after Umar to offer his allegiance. During the Ridda wars (Wars of Apostasy), Uthman remained in Medina, acting as Abu Bakr's adviser. On his deathbed, Abu Bakr dictated his will to Uthman, saying that his successor was to be Umar.

Election of Uthman 

Umar, on his deathbed formed a committee of six people to choose the next caliph from amongst themselves. This committee was:
 Ali
 Uthman ibn Affan
 Abd al-Rahman ibn Awf
 Sa'd ibn Abi Waqqas
 Zubayr ibn al-Awwam
 Talha

Umar asked that, after his death, the committee reach a final decision within three days, and the next caliph should take the oath of office on the fourth day. If Talhah joined the committee within this period, he was to take part in the deliberations, but if he did not return to Medina within this period, the other members of the committee could proceed with the decision. Abd al-Rahman bin Awf withdrew his eligibility to be appointed as caliph in order to act as a moderator and began his task by interviewing every member of the committee separately. He asked them for whom they would cast their vote. When Ali was asked, he didn't reply. When Uthman was asked, he voted for Ali, Zubayr said for Ali or Uthman and Saad said for Uthman.

Uthman was a rich merchant who used his wealth to support Islam yet at no time before his caliphate had he displayed any qualities of leadership or actually led an army. But despite this, he was chosen by the electors as the only strong counter candidate to Ali as he alone could to some extent rival Ali's close kinship ties with Muhammad.

R. V. C. Bodley believed that after Umar's assassination, Ali rejected the caliphate as he disagreed with governing according to regulations established by Abu Bakr and Umar, and that Uthman accepted those terms which he failed to honour during his ten-year caliphate.

Reign as Caliph (644–656) 

In about AD 650, Uthman began noticing slight differences in pronunciation of the Quran as Islam expanded beyond the Arabian Peninsula into Persia, the Levant, and North Africa. In order to preserve the sanctity of the text, he ordered a committee headed by Zayd ibn Thabit to use caliph Abu Bakr's copy and prepare a standard copy of the Qur'an. Thus, within 20 years of Muhammad's death, the Quran was committed to written form. That text became the model from which copies were made and promulgated throughout the urban centers of the Muslim world, and other versions are believed to have been destroyed.

While the Shī‘ah use the same Qur'an as Sunni Muslims, they do not believe however that it was first compiled by Uthman. The Shī‘ah believe that the Qur'an was gathered and compiled by Muhammad during his lifetime.

Economic and social administration 

Uthman was a shrewd businessman and a successful trader from his youth, which contributed greatly to the Rashidun Empire. Umar had established a public allowance and, on assuming office, Uthman increased it by about 25%. Umar had placed a ban on the sale of lands and the purchase of agricultural lands in conquered territories. Uthman withdrew these restrictions, in view of the fact that the trade could not flourish. Uthman also permitted people to draw loans from the public treasury. Under Umar, it had been laid down as a policy that the lands in conquered territories were not to be distributed among the combatants, but were to remain the property of the previous owners. The army felt dissatisfied at this decision, but Umar suppressed the opposition with a strong hand. Uthman followed the policy devised by Umar and there were more conquests, and the revenues from land increased considerably.

Umar had been very strict in the use of money from the public treasury—indeed, apart from the meagre allowance that had been sanctioned in his favour, Umar took no money from the treasury. He did not receive any gifts, nor did he allow any of his family members to accept any gifts from any quarter. During the time of Uthman, these restrictions were relaxed. Although Uthman still drew no personal allowance from the treasury, nor did he receive a salary, as he was a wealthy man with sufficient resources of his own, but, unlike Umar, Uthman accepted gifts and allowed his family members to do likewise from certain quarters. Uthman honestly expressed that he had the right to utilize the public funds according to his best judgment, and no one criticized him for that. The economic reforms introduced by Uthman had far-reaching effects; Muslims, as well as non-Muslims of the Rashidun Empire, enjoyed an economically prosperous life during his reign.

Military expansion 

During his rule, Uthman's military-style was more autonomical in nature as he delegated much military authority to his trusted kinsmen—e.g., Abd Allah ibn Amir, Mu'awiya I and Abd Allah ibn Sa'd—unlike Umar's more centralized policy. Consequently, this more independent policy allowed more expansion until Sindh, in modern Pakistan, which had not been touched during the tenure of Umar.

Muawiyah I had been appointed the governor of Syria by Umar in 639 to stop Byzantine harassment from the sea during the Arab-Byzantine Wars. He succeeded his elder brother Yazid ibn Abi Sufyan, who died in a plague, along with Abu Ubaidah ibn al-Jarrah, the governor before him, and 25,000 other people. Now under Uthman's rule in 649, Muawiyah was allowed to set up a navy, manned by Monophysitic Christians, Copts, and Jacobite Syrian Christian sailors and Muslim troops, which defeated the Byzantine navy at the Battle of the Masts in 655, opening up the Mediterranean.

In Hijri year 31 (c. 651), Uthman sent Abdullah ibn Zubayr and Abdullah ibn Saad to reconquer the Maghreb, where he met the army of Gregory the Patrician, Exarch of Africa and relative of Heraclius, which is recorded to have numbered between 120,000 and 200,000 soldiers, Although another estimate was recorded, Gregory's army was put at 20,000. The opposing forces clashed at Sabuthilag (or Sufetula), which became the name of this battle. Records from al-Bidayah wal Nihayah state that Abdullah's troops were completely surrounded by Gregory's army. However, Abdullah ibn Zubayr spotted Gregory in his chariot and asked Abdullah ibn Sa'd to lead a small detachment to intercept him. The interception was successful, and Gregory was slain by Zubayr's ambush party. Consequently, the morale of Byzantine army started crumbling and soon they were routed.

Some Muslim sources (Muhammad ibn Jarir al-Tabari,) claim that after the conquest of northern Africa was completed, Abdullah ibn Sa'd continued to Spain. Other prominent Muslim historians, like Ibn Kathir, have quoted the same narration. In the description of this campaign, two of Abdullah ibn Saad's generals, Abdullah ibn Nafiah ibn Husain, and Abdullah ibn Nafi' ibn Abdul Qais, were ordered to invade the coastal areas of Spain by sea, aided by a Berber force. They allegedly succeeded in conquering the coastal areas of Al-Andalus. It is not known where the Muslim force landed, what resistance they met, and what parts of Spain they actually conquered. However, it is clear that the Muslims did conquer some portion of Spain during the caliphate of Uthman, presumably establishing colonies on its coast. On this occasion, Uthman is reported to have addressed a letter to the invading force:

Although raids by Berbers and Muslims were conducted against the Visigothic Kingdom in Spain during the late 7th century, there is no evidence that Spain was invaded nor that parts of it were conquered or settled by Muslims prior to the 711 campaign by Tariq.

Abdullah ibn Saad also achieved success in the Caliphate's first decisive naval battle against the Byzantine Empire, the Battle of the Masts.

To the east, Ahnaf ibn Qais, chief of Banu Tamim and a veteran commander who conquered Shustar earlier, launched a series of further military expansions by further mauling Yazdegerd III near Oxus River in Turkmenistan and later crushing a military coalition of Sassanid loyalists and Hephthalite Empire in the Siege of Herat. Later, the governor of Basra, Abdullah ibn Aamir also led a number of successful campaigns, ranging from the suppression of revolts in Fars, Kerman, Sistan, and Khorasan, to the opening of new fronts for conquest in Transoxiana and Afghanistan.

In the next year, AD 652, Futh Al-Buldan of Baladhuri writes that Balochistan was re-conquered during the campaign against the revolt in Kermān, under the command of Majasha ibn Mas'ud. It was the first time that western Balochistan had come directly under the laws of the Caliphate and it paid an agricultural tribute.

The military campaigns under Uthman's rule were generally successful, except for a few in the kingdom of Nubia, on the lower Nile.

Public opposition to Uthman's policies

Reasons for the opposition 
Noting an increase in anti-government tension around the Caliphate, Uthman's administration decided to determine its origins, extent, and aims. Some time around 654, Uthman called all twelve provincial governors to Medina to discuss the problem. During this Council of Governors, Uthman ordered that all resolutions of the council be adopted according to local circumstances. Later, in the Majlis al Shurah (council of ministers), it was suggested to Uthman that reliable agents be sent to various provinces to attempt to determine the source of the discontent. Uthman accordingly sent Muhammad ibn Maslamah to Kufa, Usama ibn Zayd to Basra, Ammar ibn Yasir to Egypt, and Abdullah ibn Umar to Syria. The agents sent to Kufa, Basra and Syria reported that all was well—the people were generally satisfied with the administration, although some individuals had minor personal grievances. Ammar ibn Yasir, the emissary to Egypt, however, did not return to Medina. Rebels there had been issuing propaganda in favour of making Ali caliph. Ammar ibn Yasir, who had been affiliated with Ali, abandoned Uthman for the Egyptian opposition. Abdullah ibn Saad, the governor of Egypt, reported about the opposition's activities instead. He wanted to take action against Ali's foster son, Muhammad ibn Abi Bakr, Muhammad bin Abi Hudhaifa, Uthman's adopted son, and Ammar ibn Yasir.

Uthman's attempts to appease the dissidents 
In 655, Uthman directed those with any grievance against the administration, as well as the governors and "Amils" throughout the caliphate, to assemble at Mecca for the Hajj, promising that all legitimate grievances would be redressed. Accordingly, large delegations from various cities came to present their grievances before the gathering.

The rebels realized that the people in Mecca supported Uthman and were not inclined to listen to them. This represented a great psychological victory for Uthman. It is said, according to Sunni Muslim accounts, that before returning to Syria, the governor Muawiyah, Uthman's cousin, suggested that Uthman should come with him to Syria as the atmosphere there was peaceful. Uthman rejected his offer, saying that he didn't want to leave the city of Muhammad (viz., Medina). Muawiyah then suggested that he be allowed to send a strong force from Syria to Medina to guard Uthman against any possible attempt by rebels to harm him. Uthman rejected it too, saying that the Syrian forces in Medina would be an incitement to civil war, and he could not be party to such a move.

Armed revolt against Uthman 
The politics of Egypt played the major role in the propaganda war against the caliphate, so Uthman summoned Abdullah ibn Saad, the governor of Egypt, to Medina to consult with him as to the course of action that should be adopted. Abdullah ibn Saad came to Medina, leaving the affairs of Egypt to his deputy, and in his absence, Muhammad bin Abi Hudhaifa staged a coup d'état and took power. On hearing of the revolt in Egypt, Abdullah hastened back, but Uthman was not in a position to offer him any military assistance, and so Abdullah was unable to suppress the revolt.

Several Sunni scholars, such as Ibn Qutaybah, Ali Ibn Burhanuddin al-Halabi, Ibne Abi-al-Hadeed and Ibne Manzur, reported that there were several leading Sahaba among those who called upon Uthman to step down for reasons such as nepotism and profligacy.

Rebels in Medina 
From Egypt, Kufa, and Basra, contingents of about 1,000 people apiece were sent to Medina, each with instructions to assassinate Uthman and overthrow the government. Representatives of the Egyptian contingent waited on Ali, and offered him the Caliphate, but he turned them down. Representatives of the contingent from Kufa waited on Al-Zubayr, and those from Basra waited on Talhah, each offering them their allegiance as the next Caliph, but both were similarly turned down. By proposing alternatives to Uthman as Caliph, the rebels swayed public opinion in Medina to the point where Uthman's faction could no longer offer a united front. Uthman had the active support of the Umayyads, and a few other people in Medina.

Siege of Uthman 

The early stage of the siege of Uthman's house was not severe, but, as the days passed, the rebels intensified the pressure against Uthman. With the departure of the pilgrims from Medina to Mecca, the rebel position was strengthened further, and as a consequence the crisis deepened. The rebels understood that, after the Hajj, the Muslims, gathered at Mecca from all parts of the Muslim world, might march to Medina to relieve Uthman. They therefore decided to take action against Uthman before the pilgrimage was over. During the siege, Uthman was asked by his supporters, who outnumbered the rebels, to let them fight, but Uthman refused, in an effort to avoid bloodshed among Muslims. Unfortunately for Uthman, violence still occurred. The gates of the house of Uthman were shut and guarded by the renowned warrior Abd-Allah ibn al-Zubayr, along with Ali's sons, Hasan ibn Ali and Husayn ibn Ali.

Death

Assassination

On 17 June 656, finding the gate of Uthman's house strongly guarded by his supporters, some Khariji climbed the back wall and crept inside, unbeknownst to the gate guards. The Khwarij entered his room and struck blows at his head. Na'ila, Uthman's wife, threw herself on his body to protect him and raised her hand to deflect a sword. She had her fingers chopped off and was pushed aside. The next blow killed Uthman. Some of Uthman's slaves counter-attacked, one of whom killed the assassin and was in turn killed by the Khawarij.

The Kharijis tried to decapitate Uthman's corpse, but his two widows, Naila and the other one, threw themselves across the body and screamed, beating their faces and tearing their clothing, until the Khawarij were deterred. Instead, they looted the house, even snatching at the women's veils. The Khawarijites left the house and the supporters of Uthman at the gate heard them and entered, but it was too late.

Funeral 

After the body of Uthman had been in the house for three days, Naila approached some of his supporters to assist in his burial, but only about a dozen people responded, including Marwan, Zayd ibn Thabit, 'Huwatib bin Alfarah, Jubayr ibn Mut'im, Abu Jahm bin Hudaifa, Hakim bin Hazam and Niyar bin Mukarram. The body was lifted at dusk, and because of the blockade, no coffin could be procured. The body was not washed. Thus, Uthman was carried to the graveyard in the clothes that he was wearing at the time of his assassination.

Naila followed the funeral with a lamp, but, in order to maintain secrecy, the lamp had to be extinguished. Naila was accompanied by some women, including Uthman's daughter.

Burial 
The body was carried to Jannat al-Baqi for burial. Apparently, some people gathered there, and resisted Uthman's burial in the Muslim cemetery. Accordingly, Uthman's supporters later buried him in the Jewish graveyard behind Jannat al-Baqi. Some decades later, the Umayyad rulers demolished the wall separating the two cemeteries and merged the Jewish cemetery into the Muslim one to ensure that his tomb was now inside a Muslim cemetery.

The funeral prayers were led by Jabir bin Muta'am, and the dead body was lowered into the grave with little ceremony. After burial, Naila and Aisha wanted to speak, but were discouraged from doing so due to possible danger from the rioters.

Causes of anti-Uthman revolt 
The actual reason for the anti-Uthman movement is disputed among the Shia and Sunni Muslims. According to Sunni sources, unlike his predecessor, Umar, who maintained discipline with a stern hand, Uthman was less rigorous, focusing more on economic prosperity. Under Uthman, the people became more prosperous and on the political plane they came to enjoy a larger degree of freedom. No institutions were devised to channel political activity, and, in their absence, the pre-Islamic tribal jealousies and rivalries, which had been suppressed under earlier caliphs, erupted once again. The people took advantage of Uthman's leniency, which became a headache for the state, culminating in Uthman's assassination.

According to Wilferd Madelung, during Uthman's reign, "grievances against his arbitrary acts were substantial by standards of his time. Historical sources mention a lengthy account of the wrongdoings he was accused of... It was only his violent death that came to absolve him in Sunni ideology from any ahdath and make him a martyr and the third Rightly Guided Caliph." According to Keaney Heather, Uthman, as a caliph, relied solely on his own volition in picking his cabinet, which led to decisions that bred resistance within the Muslim community. Indeed, his style of governance made Uthman one of the most controversial figures in Islamic history.

The resistance against Uthman arose because he favoured family members when choosing governors, reasoning that, by doing this, he would be able to exact more influence on how the caliphate was run and consequently improve the capitalist system he worked to establish. The contrary turned out to be true and his appointees had more control over how he conducted business than he had originally planned. They went so far as to impose authoritarianism over their provinces. Indeed, many anonymous letters were written to the leading companions of Muhammad, complaining about the alleged tyranny of Uthman's appointed governors. Moreover, letters were sent to the leaders of public opinion in different provinces concerning the reported mishandling of power by Uthman's family. This contributed to unrest in the empire and finally Uthman had to investigate the matter in an attempt to ascertain the authenticity of the rumours. Wilferd Madelung discredits the alleged role of Abdullah ibn Saba in the rebellion against Uthman and observes that few if any modern historians would accept Sayf's legend of Ibn Saba. 
Bernard Lewis, a 20th-century scholar, says of Uthman:

According to R. V. C. Bodley, Uthman subjected most of the Islamic nation to his relatives, Bani Umayya, who were partially accursed during Muhammad's lifetime.

Appearance and character 

The historian al-Tabari notes that Uthman was of medium height, strong-boned and broad-shouldered, and walked in a bowlegged manner. He is said to have had large limbs, with fleshy shins and long, hairy forearms. Though commonly described as having been very handsome with a fair complexion, when viewed up close, light scars from a childhood bout of smallpox were said to have been evident on his face. He had a full reddish-brown beard to which he applied saffron and thick curly hair which grew past his ears, though receded at the front. His teeth were bound with gold wire, with the front ones being noted as being particularly fine.

Unlike his predecessor Umar, Uthman was not a skilled orator, having grown tongue-tied during his first address as caliph. He remained somewhat apart from the other close Sahaba, having been an elegant, educated and cultured merchant-prince standing out among his poorer compatriots. This was a trait which had been acknowledged by Muhammad. One story relates that Aisha, having noted that Muhammad reclined comfortably and spoke casually with Abu Bakr and Umar, asked him why when he addressed Uthman, he chose to gather his clothing neatly and assume a formal manner. Muhammad replied that "Uthman is modest and shy and if l had been informal with him, he would not have said what he had come here to say".

Uthman was a family man who led a simple life even after becoming the caliph, despite the fact that his flourishing family business had made him rich. Prior caliphs had been paid for their services from the bayt al-mal, the public treasury, but the independently wealthy Uthman never took a salary. Uthman was also a humanitarian: he customarily freed slaves every Friday, looked after the widows and orphans, and gave unlimited charity. His patience and endurance were among the characteristics that made him a successful leader. As a way of taking care of Muhammad's wives, he doubled their allowances. Uthman wasn't completely plain and simple, however: he built a palace for himself in Medina, known as Al-Zawar, with a notable feature being doors of precious wood. Although Uthman paid for the palace with his own money, Shia Muslims considered it his first step towards ruling like a king.

It was asked of Uthman why he did not drink wine during the Age of Ignorance, when there was no objection to this practice (before the revelation of Islam). He replied: "I saw that it made the intellect flee in its entirety, and I've never known of something to do this and then return in its entirety."

Legacy 
The general opinion of the Sunni Muslim community and Sunni historians regarding Uthman's rule were positive, particularly regarding his leniency; in their view, his alleged nepotism concerned the kinsmen he appointed, such as Muawiya and Abdullah ibn Aamir, proven to be effective in both military and political management. Historians, like Zaki Muhammad, accused Uthman of corruption, particularly in the case of Waleed ibn Uqba.Perhaps the most significant act of Uthman was allowing Muawiya and Abdullah ibn Saad, governors respectively of Syria and Northern Africa, to form the first integrated Muslim navy in the Mediterranean Sea, rivalling the maritime domination of the Byzantine Empire.The Great Arab Conquests By Hugh Kennedy, page 326 Ibn Saad's conquest of the southeast coast of Spain, his stunning victory at the Battle of the Masts in Lycia, and expansion to other coasts of the Mediterranean Sea are generally overlooked. These achievements gave birth to the first Muslim standing navy, thus enabling the first Muslim maritime conquest of Cyprus and Rhodes.Warren Treadgold, A history of the Byzantine State and Society, Stanford University Press 1997, 314.  This subsequently paved the way for the establishment of several Muslim states in the Mediterranean Sea during the later Umayyad and Abbasid eras, which came in the form of the Emirate of Sicily and its minor vassal the Emirate of Bari,Kreutz citation of Baladhuri, 38. as well as the Emirate of Crete and the Aglabid Dynasty. The significance of Uthman's naval development and its political legacy was agreed upon by Muhammad M.Ag, author of Islamic Fiscal and Monetary Policy and further strengthened by Hassan Khalileh referencing Tarikh al Bahriyya wal Islamiyya fii Misr wal Sham ("History of the Seas and Islam in Egypt and Levant") by Ahmad Abaddy and Esayyed Salem.From an expansionist perspective, Uthman is regarded as skilled in conflict management, as is evident from how he dealt with the heated and troubled early Muslim conquered territories, such as Kufa and Basra, by directing the hot-headed Arab settlers to new military campaigns and expansions. This not only resulted in settling the internal conflicts in those settlements, but also further expanded Rashidun territory to as far west as southern Iberia and as far east as Sindh, Pakistan.

See also 

 List of Sahabah

Notes

References

Bibliography

Further reading

Online 
'Uthmān ibn 'Affān Muslim caliph, in Encyclopædia Britannica Online, by Asma Afsaruddin, Gita Liesangthem, Surabhi Sinha, Noah Tesch and The Editors of Encyclopaedia Britannica

External links 

Views of various Islamic historians on Uthman:
 Uthman in History
 Quilliam Press: Uthman ibn Affan
Views of the Arab Media on Uthman:
 Ever Since the Murder of Uthman
Shia view of Uthman:
 Uthman's election
 The assassination of `Uthman Ibn `Affan
 Uthman and Abdullah bin Massood

 
579 births
656 deaths
7th-century murdered monarchs
7th-century caliphs
Assassinated caliphs
Banu Umayya
Deaths by beating
Rashidun caliphs
Sahabah martyrs
Sahabah who participated in the battle of Uhud
Burials at Jannat al-Baqī
Arab Muslims